Algernon Charles Swinburne (1837–1909) was an English poet and writer.

Swinburne or Swinburn may also refer to:


People
 Swinburne (surname)
 Swinburne Hale (1884–1937), American lawyer, poet, and socialist
 Swinburne Lestrade, Dominican economist

Places
 Swinburne, Free State, South Africa, a village
 Swinburne Island, New York City, United States
 Swinburne Ice Shelf, Antarctica

Schools
 Swinburne Senior Secondary College, Melbourne, Australia
 Swinburne University of Technology, Melbourne, Australia
 Swinburne University of Technology Sarawak Campus, Kuching, Malaysia

Other uses
 Swinburne baronets, a title in the Peerage of England

Masculine given names